Sphaeropteris squamulata,  synonym Cyathea squamulata, is a species of tree fern native to the Malay Peninsula, Sumatra, Java, Borneo and the southern Philippines, including the Sulu Archipelago, where it grows in forest from the lowlands to an altitude of about 1500 m. The trunk is erect and up to 2 m tall. Fronds are pinnate or bipinnate and approximately 1.5 m long. The stipe is covered in densely packed firm, medium brown scales. Sori occur near the fertile pinnule midvein and lack indusia.

References

squamulata
Ferns of Asia
Flora of Malesia
Flora of Sumatra
Flora of Java
Flora of Borneo
Flora of the Philippines